Francis Bacon: The Logic of Sensation is a 1981 book by the philosopher Gilles Deleuze, in which the author elaborates philosophical concepts in art, aesthetics, percepts and sensation through a sustained analysis of the work of the twentieth-century British figurative painter Francis Bacon. It was translated into English by Daniel W. Smith.

The book engages with Bacon's work and the nature and potential of art. While it is occasionally viewed solely as a work of art history, Deleuze's larger motivation is the concept of art beyond "representation" of an image.

Deleuze's art theory
Deleuze claims that Bacon's art, with its bodies as figures, and spaces as "round areas", exists in the zone of indiscernibility, a parallel to the plane of immanence which also artistically follows lines of flight in "the act of fleeing or eluding". However, the book is intended to be built on a slow intensification of its titular viewpoint, "a general logic of sensation", which progresses "in an order that moves from the simplest to the most complex." Deleuze's concept of becoming, which he had explored in detail a year earlier with Félix Guattari in A Thousand Plateaus (1980), is a theoretical base for his interpretation of Francis Bacon's art. 

In a mode similar to another previous work of his, The Logic of Sense (1969), Deleuze presents a full logic of sensation in response to Bacon's transgressive use of smearing, detachment and destruction of signifiers in relation to bodies, modern myths, and portraits. Deleuze remarks in the final preface of the book that Francis Bacon's art is "of a very special violence." In saying this, he analyzes the familiar content of Bacon's paintings, which make "use of spectacles of horror, crucifixions, prostheses and mutilations, monsters," but are always set on fields of color with shallow depth. Employing the rhizomatic, or nonlinear, mode of analysis that his works are often characterized by, Deleuze cites as one of his main literary examples a line from Samuel Beckett's short story "The Lost Ones" (1966-1970): "Inside a flattened cylinder. [...] The light, [...] Its yellowness." However, Deleuze remarks that "if these fields of the color press toward the Figure, the Figure, in turn, presses outward, trying to pass and dissolve through the fields."

References

Further reading 
Deleuze, Gilles (2003) Francis Bacon: The Logic of Sensation. London: Continuum

External links 
 Paintings Cited in Deleuze's Francis Bacon: The Logic of Sensation

1981 non-fiction books
French non-fiction books
Works about painters
Works by Gilles Deleuze
Francis Bacon (artist)
Continuum International Publishing Group books